The Mississippi and Tennessee Railroad was an American railroad constructed in the 1850s, connecting Memphis, Tennessee with Grenada, Mississippi.  In Grenada, the line connected with the Mississippi Central Railroad.

History
The railroad was incorporated on October 16, 1852, and enabled cotton plantations in the Mississippi Delta to ship their product to Memphis, where it was loaded onto steamboats and transported to New Orleans.

The city of Batesville, Mississippi was founded following the construction of the railway, and drew its residents from surrounding communities.

During the Civil War, the railroad's trestle over the Coldwater River was destroyed by Federal troops.  Following the war, the railroad was "a complete wreck, and literally without rolling stock".

The railroad was purchased in 1886 by the Illinois Central Railroad.

Current use
The line is currently used by the Grenada Railway.

References

Defunct Mississippi railroads
Defunct Tennessee railroads
Predecessors of the Illinois Central Railroad
Railway companies established in 1852
Railway companies disestablished in 1886
1852 establishments in Mississippi
American companies established in 1852
American companies disestablished in 1886